The 1994 Philippine Basketball Association (PBA) rookie draft was an event at which teams drafted players from the amateur ranks. It was held on January 16, 1994, at the Crystal Ballroom of the Hyatt Hotel in Manila.

Round 1

Round 2

Round 3

Round 4

Round 5

Notes
 Amateur standouts Marlou Aquino and Edward Joseph Feihl, both of Adamson University, withdrew their applications.
 Pepsi's rights to Richard Anthony Ticzon, including second-round draft picks in the 1995 and 1996 drafts, were traded to Purefoods for Dindo Pumaren and Dwight Lago.
 In another draft day trade, Pepsi traded its second round rights to Shell for Rey Cuenco.

Sources
 "Ballclubs stunned by Feihl, Aquino decision," The Philippine Star, January 6, 1994.
 "Ginebra starts new build-up with Locsin," The Philippine Star, January 17, 1994.

References

Philippine Basketball Association draft
Draft